Novoitikeyevo (Yañı Etekäy) is a rural locality (a village) in Batyrovsky Selsoviet, Aurgazinsky District, Bashkortostan, Russia. The population was 425 as of 2010. There are 8 streets.

Geography 
Novoitikeyevo is located 6 km east of Tolbazy (the district's administrative centre) by road. Staroitikeyevo is the nearest rural locality.

References 

Rural localities in Aurgazinsky District